The 1992 Miller Lite Hall of Fame Tennis Championships, was a men's tennis tournament played on outdoor grass courts at the Newport Casino  in Newport, Rhode Island, United States that was part of the World Series of the 1992 ATP Tour. It was the 19th edition of the tournament and was held from July 6 through July 12, 1992. Unseeded Bryan Shelton won his second consecutive singles title at the event.

Finals

Singles
 Bryan Shelton defeated  Alex Antonitsch 6–4, 6–4
 It was Shelton's first singles title of the year and the second, and last, of his career.

Doubles
 Royce Deppe /  David Rikl defeated  Paul Annacone /  David Wheaton 6–4, 6–4

References

External links
 ITF tournament edition details

Hall of Fame Tennis Championships
Hall of Fame Open
Hall of Fame Tennis Championships
Hall of Fame Tennis Championships
Hall of Fame Tennis Championships